Shediac is a civil parish in Westmorland County, New Brunswick, Canada.

For governance purposes it is divided between the city of Dieppe, the towns of Cap-Acadie and Shediac, the incorporated rural communities of Beausoleil and Maple Hills, and the Southeast rural district. Beausoleil is a members of the Kent Regional Service Commission, with the rest all belonging to the Southeast Regional Service Commission.

Prior to the 2023 governance reform, the parish was divided between Dieppe, Shediac, the village of Cap-Pelé, the rural community of Beaubassin East, and the local service districts of Grande-Digue, Pointe-du-Chêne, Scoudouc, Scoudouc Road, Shediac Bridge-Shediac River, Shediac Cape, and the parish of Shediac. With minor boundary changes, Grande-Digue and Shediac Bridge-Shediac River are now part of Beausoleil; Pointe-du-Chêne, Scoudouc, Scoudouc Road, and Shediac Cape were annexed by Shediac; Cap-Pelé and Beaubassin East merged to form Cap-Acadie; and the Shediac Parish LSD was divided between Beausoleil and Maple Hills.

Origin of name
The parish's name comes the community of Shediac, itself from a corruption of Mi'kmaq Es-ed-ei'-ik, translated by Rand as "running far back." There was a Fort Shediac mentioned in documents around 1755, on the mainland opposite Shediac Island.

History
Shediac was erected in 1827 from Dorchester and Sackville Parishes. The eastern boundary was at the mouth of the Kouchibouguac River.

In 1850 the eastern boundary was moved to run through Cap-Pelé.

In 1894 the existing boundaries were declared retroactive to the parish's erection.

In 1904 the boundary with Botsford Parish was clarified.

Boundaries
Shediac Parish is bounded:

 on the north by the Kent County line and Northumberland Strait;
 on the east by a line beginning about 375 metres east of the mouth of the Tedish River and running south 4º 30' west to a point about 1.6 kilometres northwesterly of the junction of Chemin des Moulins and Route 940 and about 450 metres from Square Lake;
 on the south by the prolongation of a line running south 83º 45' east from the southern side of the mouth of Fox Creek;
 on the west by a line beginning about 1.3 kilometres east of the Memramcook River, at the prolongation of the southwestern line of a grant to Columb Connor on Route 134, then running northwesterly along the prolongation, the Connor grant, and its northwesterly prolongation to the Kent County line.

Communities
Communities at least partly within the parish. bold indicates an incorporated municipality or rural community; italics indicate a name no longer in official use

 Batemans Mills
  Cap-Pelé
 Dupuis Corner
  Dieppe
 Evangeline
 Gilberts Corner
 MacDougall
 Malakoff
 Moncton Road
  Pointe-du-Chêne
  Saint-Philippe
  Scoudouc (Dorchester Crossing)
 Shediac
 Chapman Corner
 East Shediac
 Ohio-du-Barachois
 Rings Corner
  Shediac Bridge
  Shediac River
 Shediac Cape
 The Bluff
  Beaubassin East
 Barachois
  Basse-Aboujagane
 Boudreau
 Bourgeois Mills
  Cap-Brûlé
  Cormier-Village
 Drisdelle
 Gallant Settlement
 Glaude
  Haute-Aboujagane
 LeBlanc
 Robichaud
 Saint-André-de-Shédiac

Bodies of water
Bodies of water at least partly within the parish.

 Aboujagane River
 Kinnear River
 Kouchibouguac River
 Scoudouc River
 Shediac River
 Tedish River
 Bear Creek
 Mill Creek
 Shediac Bay
  Shediac Harbour
 Lac des Boudreau
 Poucette Lake
 Petit Barachois

Islands
Islands at least partly within the parish.
  Shediac Island
 Skull Island

Other notable places
Parks, historic sites, and other noteworthy places at least partly within the parish.
 Cormier Aerodrome
 Parlee Beach Provincial Park
 Scoudouc Industrial Park
 Shediac Bridge Aerodrome

Demographics
Parish population total does not include the town of Shediac and portions within Dieppe, Cap-Pelé, and Beaubassin East

Population

Language
Mother tongue (2016)

Access routes
Highways and numbered routes that run through the parish, including external routes that start or finish at the parish limits:

Highways

Principal Routes

Secondary Routes:
None

External Routes:
None

See also
List of parishes in New Brunswick
Greater Shediac

Notes

References

External links
 Rural community of Beaubassin East
 Village of Cap-Pelé
 City of Dieppe
 District de services locaux de Grande-Digue
 Town of Shediac

Parishes of Westmorland County, New Brunswick